Marion Lievre (born January 10, 1991) is a French female rugby union player. She represented  at the 2014 Women's Rugby World Cup. She was a member of the squad that won their fourth Six Nations title in 2014.

References

1991 births
Living people
French female rugby union players